Wu Heling  (1896–1980) was a politician in the Republic of China. He was born in Hortin Right Banner, Zhelimu League (now Horqin District, Tongliao), Inner Mongolia. His Mongolian name was Ünenbayan. He was ethnic Mongol, and participated in the Mongolian Autonomous Movement. Heling became an important politician in the Mongolian United Autonomous Government and the Mongolian Autonomous Federation.

Early life and education 
Wu graduated from the Chengde Normal School in what was then Rehe Province, and afterwards the Beijing Law College. In 1918 he entered Peking University, while he worked at the Minister of Interior, Beijing Government. He also provided support to Prince Gungsangnorbu of Harqin Right Banner at the office for Mongolian and Tibetan. At that time, he also worked at Beijing Normal University and was vice-secretary-general of the Beijing Young Christian Association. He graduated from Peking University in 1926, and not long after joined the Kuomintang.

Political career
In April 1929 Wu was appointed chief of the office for Mongolian Banner to Beiping, and Counselor of the Mongolian and Tibetan Affairs Commission, National Government. The following January he transferred to the position of Chief Office for Mongolian Affairs of the Mongolian and Tibetan Affairs Commission. In June 1932 he returned to his old job as the Counselor of the Commission. In March 1934 he was appointed a member of the Mongol Local Autonomy Political Affairs Committee and of the Mongolian and Tibetan Affairs Commission. In September he was appointed Chief of Counselor of the Counseling Agency, Mongolian Local Autonomy Political Council.

In May 1936 Yondonwangchug and Demchugdongrub established the Mongol Military Government, in which Wu also participated: he was appointed Director of the Counseling Bureau and Sub-General and to other positions. In October 1937 he was appointed President of the House of Counselors, Mongol United Autonomous Government. In September 1939 he became Counselor of the House of Counselors in that government. He was promoted to the position of Chairman of the House the following year. In 1941 he was appointed President of the House for Political Affairs, Mongolian Autonomous Federation. Later he also sat as President of the Preparatory School for Studying in Japan.

After the Mongolian Autonomous Federation collapsed, Wu returned to Chiang Kai-shek's National Government, and was appointed Chief of the Advertising Association of the Military Commission. In 1949 he participated in the Western Mongolian Autonomous Movement; after the failure of this movement, he escaped to Taiwan.

Wu died in 1980.

References

Bibliography

 
 
  Mongolian Culture Web
 
 
 

1896 births
1980 deaths
People from Tongliao
Republic of China politicians from Inner Mongolia
Mongol collaborators with Imperial Japan